La Convalescence is a quartier of Terre-de-Haut Island, located in Îles des Saintes archipelago in the Caribbean. It is located in the Southwestern part of the island. It is built on a mount called La Convalescence also called Morne Gros Dos.

Populated places in Îles des Saintes
Quartiers of Îles des Saintes